Maria Angel MBE is a British academic.  In 2008, Angel founded and became daily operations director of the 'Normandy Youth Club–The N-Factor' charity organization located in Surrey, England.

Career
Angel holds a BA (Hons) in Business and Management, as well as a PGCE certification, a QTLS status, and an FCMI. She is a sixth form teacher.

The Normandy Youth Club
Angel founded the 'Normandy Youth Club–The N-Factor' charitable institution in January 2009.  The community organization was targeted to help combat the increasing incidents of youth crime in Normandy, Surrey, England and its surrounding hamlets.

The group was staffed and run by volunteers. It was based out of Normandy Village Hall and catered specifically to rural youth aged eight to 18 years of age.  The club was aimed at young people from disadvantaged and marginalised communities in Normandy and its surrounding hamlets, including those from minority group communities.   The club was closed in October 2016 due to a lack of funding.

Recognition
The Normandy Youth Club was recognised by UK Prime Minister Gordon Brown and his wife Sarah in 2010.
Maria Angel was recognised by Her Majesty The Queen Elizabeth II in the 2018 New Year Honours.

Personal and organization honours

References

External links
 Normandy Youth Club–The N-Factor defunct web-site
 N Factor on YouTube

Civil crime prevention
Volunteer cooperatives
English schoolteachers
People from Surrey